Trans World Entertainment was an American independent production and distribution company which produced a low-to-medium budget films mostly targeted for home-video market. In the early 1990s, the company became embroiled in the Credit Lyonnais banking scandal in Hollywood and was foreclosed on by the bank and subsequently folded into Metro-Goldwyn-Mayer (MGM) for sale.

History

Founding and early years (1983–1986)
The company was founded as a video distribution company in 1983 by Moshe Diamant and Eduard Sarlui, a filmmaker whose company Continental Motion Pictures, founded with his sister Helen, had previously produced a number of films including Ator, the Fighting Eagle and Warrior of the Lost World. In 1984, it bought out the video distribution rights to shows handled by various syndicators, including Viacom Enterprises and Ziv International for a 200-title agreement. Also that year, it expanded into the world of theatrical film distribution and production, with a lineup of fully-funded films (three films per year), some of which were exhibited at the Cannes Film Festival; the theatrical film division was headed up by William Dunn. Diamant met with filmmaker William Malone in 1985 and Malone pitched him a science-fiction horror film in the vein of Alien. The resulting film was Creature. Trans World Entertainment also produced Pray for Death starring Sho Kosugi the same year. Both films were maligned by critics, but were successful in the home video marketplace. Also in 1985, Trans World Entertainment agreed to merge with Cardinal Entertainment to form a new outfit, Cardinal/TWE; Cardinal Entertainment would be the distributor of Trans World Entertainment's theatrical feature film projects. TWE additionally entered into an agreement with Sarlui's Continental Motion Pictures; Continental would handle worldwide distribution on the titles TWE produced (aiming for six to ten pictures per year), and Continental gained access to the TWE library.

In 1986, Media Home Entertainment inked a deal with TWE for Media to distribute TWE's theatrical titles on videocassette. That year, Eduard Sarlui joined the company as CEO and chairman, while Paul Mason was installed as President of Production; TWE's output increased considerably. This was primarily due to them acquiring the rights to Italian genre titles from filmmakers such as Joe D'Amato; TWE would retitle and dub them and release them straight to video. On September 10, 1986, Trans World Entertainment announced that David Keith had signed on to direct two projects greenlit by TWE.

Founding of Epic Productions and acquisition of Empire International Pictures (1986–1989)

The company employed a pre-sales model for their product and through the mid-to-late 1980s continued to produce modest direct to video hits such as Moon in Scorpio starring Britt Ekland and Interzone. They also continued to distribute films such as Killer Klowns from Outer Space. In 1987, they signed a multi-picture deal with Italian producer Ovidio G. Assonitis.
The first of the films to be produced was The Farm, released as The Curse, a science-fiction horror film starring Wil Wheaton and Claude Akins, based on H. P. Lovecraft's short story The Colour Out of Space. The film earned $1,169,922 from its opening weekend, and finished with a gross of $1,930,001 at the box office. The film also sold considerably well on home video.

In 1986, Diamont and Sarlui created a sister company entitled Epic Productions; Sarlui would remain chairman and CEO of Trans World Entertainment and Diamont would become CEO and Chairman of Epic. A line of credit of $60 million was arranged with French bank Credit Lyonnais Bank Nederland for Epic to produce films that would be distributed under an exclusive marketing agreement with RCA/Columbia Pictures Home Video. Assonitis' next two films for Trans World Entertainment, The Bite and Amok Train, were retitled as Curse II: The Bite and Beyond the Door III respectively by RCA/Columbia Pictures to capitalize on the success of The Curse and Assonitis' 1974 mega-hit Beyond the Door, despite no connections between the films.

On October 22, 1986, TWE announced plans to make multiple high-budget films that would begin production within the next nine months; their sales effort included a package of pictures from Continental Motion Pictures, led by Helen Sarlui, which was now served as vice president of TWE's video division, and included the signing of deals with various writers, including Steven de Souza, who was signed to write three films and given an opportunity to make his directorial debut and serve as overall creative consultant of the studio.

On February 18, 1987, while TWE was in the stages of prepping 20 projects for release, the company started its own domestic distribution division, paying out $5 million in royalties to the studio for its own first four feature films; additionally, Dino Constantine Conte had signed a three-picture agreement with the studio in order to serve as producer on TWE's film productions, beginning with November Man, and announced a second picture in TWE's two-picture deal with film star Beau Bridges. On April 8, 1987, Sunil Shah, who was president of TWE, left the company to set up a new home video/film distributor, Imperial Entertainment.

In late August 1987, TWE signed another six-picture agreement with Media; their previous deal brought MHE the home video rights to such films as Full Moon in Blue Water, Kansas, Killer Klowns from Outer Space, Hardcover, Cinderella Rock and Teen Witch; the new deal included the video rights to titles like Rage of Honor, Programmed to Kill and Iron Warrior; all rights reverted from Heron to TWE by 1989.

By 1988, Charles Band's Empire International Pictures began to collapse under mounting long-term debt obligations to Crédit Lyonnais, which included the purchase of Castello di Giove, a 12th-century castle located in Giove, Italy. and the Dino de Laurentiis Cinematografica. Crédit Lyonnais foreclosed on Empire, forcing founder Band out. The bank then approached Epic with an offer to extend their line of credit from $60 million to $200 million to absorb Empire's assets into Epic and restructure the company. Epic's takeover of Empire was completed in May 1988 and led to in-production titles such as Stuart Gordon's Robot Jox, Peter Manoogian's Arena, and David Schmoeller's Catacombs to be delayed in release by several years.

The merger with Empire allowed several in-production Trans World titles to be released as "stand-alone" sequels to earlier films, such as Goblins directed by Claudio Fragasso being renamed Troll 2 and Panga to be released as Curse III: Blood Sacrifice. Catacombs was also retitled as Curse IV: The Ultimate Sacrifice.

In September 1988, Diamont and Sarlui founded a separate company, Cinema Corp. of America, to produce larger scale theatrical motion pictures alongside independent film producer Elliott Kastner. The start-up company was assisted by Crédit Lyonnais with an initial start-up investment of $65 million. Kastner signed Marlon Brando to write and star in their first picture, Jericho, where Brando would play a CIA agent who comes out of a retirement for a tricky assignment. Donald Cammell was tapped to direct with shooting slated to begin in Mexico in November 1988, but after months of pre-production on location, Brando apparently dropped out of the project, citing insurance issues.

During this time, Trans World Entertainment and Epic Productions continued to produce and release films such as Ghosts Can't Do It starring Bo Derek, Anthony Quinn and Donald Trump; and Honeymoon Academy with Robert Hays and Kim Cattrall.

Vision International deal and exit from film production (1990–1991)

President of Production Paul Mason departed the company in 1990, and the company was still producing five pictures a year, including Ski Patrol and releasing Italian imports such as Top Model 2, directed by Pasquale Fanetti. However, the restructuring following the acquisition of Empire by Crédit Lyonnais caused friction between Diamont, Sarlui and the bank. By this time, Crédit Lyonnais had financed the takeover of The Cannon Group Inc. and Metro-Goldwyn-Mayer by Italian financier Giancarlo Parretti and Parretti was close to defaulting on his loans. Diamont and Sarlui discovered that the Crédit Lyonnais restructuring was also hiding bad debt incurred by the bank.

While this was going on, Trans World Entertainment and Epic Productions entered into a sales distribution agreement with Mark Damon's Vision P.D.G. International. The deal effectively ended Trans World Entertainment as a distribution entity with Moshe Diamant becoming co-chairman of Vision and Sarlui also becoming a significant shareholder. The final film to carry the Trans World Entertainment name was Eyes of an Angel starring John Travolta. Trans World Entertainment effectively became a holding company for the library of 150 produced films.

Shortly afterwards, Vision International and Epic Productions entered into a co-production deal with Stone Group Pictures, owned by Michael Douglas.

Crédit Lyonnais control (1992–1996)

Crédit Lyonnais foreclosed on Giancarlo Parretti and Metro-Goldwyn-Mayer in 1991 and investigations in both the United States and France began into the bank's practices and associations. In August 1992, Crédit Lyonnais foreclosed on Epic Productions and Trans World Entertainment, removing Moshe Diamant and Eduard Sarlui from the company. Immediately following their removal, Vision International terminated their production and distribution agreement with Epic and Trans World. Former company directors Diamant and Sarlui immediately filed a lawsuit against the bank for $100 million for breach of contract and various damages; January 1993 saw Crédit Lyonnais file a countersuit against Diamant and Sarlui claiming they overstated the company's financial position and stole money from the bank. Sarlui and Diamant also sued their former attorney, Eugene L. Wolver, for assisting Crédit Lyonnais in their attempts to bury their bad loans in the Empire/Epic merger, leading to Epic being seized by the bank.

During this time, Vision International cut ties with Crédit Lyonnais completely, instead receiving backing from Mercantile National and Kreditbank Luxembourg. However, the ongoing lawsuits with Crédit Lyonnais put pressure on Vision International's producing interest, which lead to founder Mark Damon to depart the company in June 1993. In a judgement in May 1993, Crédit Lyonnais was barred from foreclosing on Trans World Entertainment due to the ongoing lawsuit from Sarlui and Diamant. Eventually Diamant joined Damon at his new company, Mark Damon Productions, in 1994 once the issues between Vision International and Crédit Lyonnais were resolved. Sarlui continued to be a shareholder in Mark Damon Productions, but no longer held an active position in the company. Once the lawsuits were settled, Crédit Lyonnais paid compensation to both Diamant and Sarlui and Trans World Entertainment was rolled into Epic Productions, under Crédit Lyonnais control.

Sale to PolyGram Filmed Entertainment and MGM ownership (1997–1998)

After Crédit Lyonnais successfully combined the assets of The Cannon Group Inc., Cannon Pictures and Pathé Communications, merged them into MGM and sold the company back to Kirk Kerkorian for a reported $1.3 billion, the same amount Giancarlo Parretti had purchased it from Kerkorian for (a significant overall loss for the bank), they sought to do the same with the assets of Epic Productions, Trans World Entertainment, Empire International, Vision International and other film libraries they now owned (which included films from Castle Rock Entertainment, Nelson Entertainment, Sherwood Productions and successor Gladden Entertainment, MCEG Virgin (including Manson International, which MCEG had acquired in 1987), Atlantic Releasing, Island Alive, Hemdale Film Corporation, Dino De Laurentiis Communications, Fries Entertainment and Scotti Bros. Pictures among others; via Nelson, video rights to the Avco Embassy Pictures library, owned by StudioCanal, were also included). The bank merged the libraries into the "Epic Film Collection" or simply the "Epic library" (organized into different holding companies named after the Greek alphabet, i.e. "Alpha Library Company") and began to take bids on the property. MGM, The Walt Disney Company, PolyGram Filmed Entertainment and Live Entertainment all submitted bids, with the ultimate winner being PolyGram with an offer of $225 million.

Despite this success, PolyGram Filmed Entertainment sold their library to MGM the following year for $235 million, following a buyout by Seagram's and the merger of PolyGram into Universal Pictures. The library was purchased by Orion Pictures—then recently acquired by MGM—as to avoid a video distribution pact MGM had with Warner Home Video; this resulted, after a legal battle, in MGM breaking their video distribution agreement with Warner earlier than intended, and MGM then began to release these movies under their own branding (though these libraries are still held within the former Orion Pictures).

Filmography

Trans World Entertainment

Productions

Theatrical distribution

Home video releases

Non-US home video releases

Epic Productions

Productions

Home video releases

Vision International

Productions

Theatrical distribution

Home video releases

Notelist

References

Home video companies of the United States
American companies established in 1983
American companies disestablished in 1991
Defunct film and television production companies of the United States
Mass media companies established in 1983
Mass media companies disestablished in 1991
Companies based in Los Angeles
1983 establishments in California
1991 disestablishments in California